Kristina Alexeyevna Ilinykh (born 27 November 1994) is a Russian diver.

She competed at the 2015 World Aquatics Championships, and the 2016 Summer Olympics. She won bronze with partner Nadezhda Bazhina at the 2017 World Aquatics Championships in the 3 m synchronized springboard competition.

References

External links

Russian female divers
Living people
Place of birth missing (living people)
1994 births
Divers at the 2016 Summer Olympics
Olympic divers of Russia
World Aquatics Championships medalists in diving